Avimiled Rivas Quintero  (born 17 October 1984) is a Colombian football player who has played for Millonarios, Deportes Quindío, Atlético Nacional, CP Ejido, SD Eibar and Once Caldas, as well as the Colombia national team. Rivas currently plays for Cortuluá as an attacking midfielder.

With the Colombia national football team, he won the South American Youth Championship in 2005 and played the 2003 FIFA World Youth Championship reaching the semi final and beating Argentina 2-1

External links
 
 Profile at FIFA.com
 Player profile at FootballDatabase.com

1984 births
Living people
Footballers from Cali
Colombian footballers
Colombia international footballers
Colombia under-20 international footballers
Millonarios F.C. players
Deportes Quindío footballers
Atlético Nacional footballers
Polideportivo Ejido footballers
SD Eibar footballers
Once Caldas footballers
Atlético Huila footballers
Boyacá Chicó F.C. footballers
Cortuluá footballers
Patriotas Boyacá footballers
Deportes Tolima footballers
América de Cali footballers
Categoría Primera A players
Colombian expatriate footballers
Expatriate footballers in Venezuela
Association football midfielders